In Dark Purity is the third studio album by American death metal band Monstrosity. The first version of this album was released by German Metal Age Recordings (Turbo Rec. follow-up label). However, the label was a rip-off label and therefore Monstrosity later re-released it through The Plague Rec. as LP and CD. This album was recorded at Morrisound Recording Studio in Tampa, Florida. This is also the first album to not feature George “Corpsegrinder” Fisher on lead vocals.

Track listing

Personnel
Monstrosity
Jason Avery – vocals
Tony Norman – guitars
Jason Morgan – guitars (not credited)
Kelly Conlon – bass
Lee Harrison – drums
Production
Tim Hubbard – photography
Eric Johnson – cover art
Monstrosity – producer
Jim Ward Morris – engineer, digital editing
Jose Perez – logo

References

1999 albums
Monstrosity (band) albums